Bamab Napo (born 23 May 1984 in Dimouri, Togo) is a Togoese runner. She competed at the 2012 Summer Olympics in the 100 m event and she was eliminated after the qualifying heats.

References 

1984 births
Living people
People from Kara Region
Togolese female sprinters
Olympic athletes of Togo
Athletes (track and field) at the 2012 Summer Olympics
Olympic female sprinters
21st-century Togolese people